Pigment Red 149 is an organic compound that is used as a pigment. Structurally, it is a derivative of perylene, although it is produced from perylenetetracarboxylic dianhydride by derivatization with 3,5-dimethylaniline.

References 

Perylene dyes
Vat dyes
Imides